Eressa rubribasis is a moth of the family Erebidae. It was described by Joseph de Joannis in 1912. It is found in China.

References

 

Eressa
Moths described in 1912